Henry Banks (1913 – 1994) was an English-born American driver.

Henry Banks may also refer to:

Henry Bankes (1757–1834), English politician and author

See also
Henry William Banks Davis (1833–1914), English landscape and animal painter
Harry Banks, improper name of Sergeant Harry Band, also known as The Crucified Soldier